Cistus salviifolius, common names sage-leaved rock-rose, salvia cistus or Gallipoli rose, is a shrub of the family Cistaceae.

Etymology
The genus name Cistus derives from the Ancient Greek words κίσθος (kisthos) meaning basket, while the species name salviifolius refers the wrinkled leaves similar to those of the sage.

Description
Cistus salviifolius has spreading stems covered by clumpy hairs. The oval-shaped green leaves are 1 to 4 centimeters long, opposite, reticulate, tomentose on both sides, with a short petiole (2–4 mm).

The inflorescence holds one or more round flowers, long-stalked, arranged at the leaf axils. The five white petals have a yellow spot at the base, forming a corolla 4–6 cm in diameter. The stamens are also yellow and the anthers shed abundant yellow pollen. This plant is pollinated by insects (entomophily), especially by bees. The flowering period extends from April through May. The fruit is a pentagonal capsule, 5–7 mm long.

Phylogeny
Cistus salviifolius belongs to the white and whitish pink flowered clade of Cistus species.

Gallery

Cultivation
Cistus salviifolius cultivated in the nursery industry, and grown in gardens and public landscapes, often for its drought-tolerant and pollinator habitat attributes.

Distribution
This showy wildflower is native to the Mediterranean region, in southern Europe and parts of Western Asia and North Africa.

Habitat
It regrows very quickly following a fire.

Synonyms

Other synonyms reported by The Plant List include:
Cistus apricus Timb.-Lagr.
Cistus arrigens Timb.-Lagr.
Cistus elegans Timb.-Lagr.
Cistus fruticans Timb.-Lagr.
Cistus humilis Timb.-Lagr.
Cistus microphyllus Timb.-Lagr.
Cistus platyphyllus Timb.-Lagr.
Cistus rhodanensis Timb.-Lagr.
Cistus sideritis C.Presl
Cistus velutinus Timb.-Lagr.

Chemistry
Cistus salviifolius contains flavan-3ols, oligomeric proanthocyanidins and prodelphinidins such as epigallocatechin-3-O-(4-hydroxybenzoate), epigallocatechin-(4β→8)-epigallocatechin, epigallocatechin -3-O-gallate-(4β→8)-epigallocatechin, epigallocatechin-(4β→6)-epigallocatechin-3-O-gallate, 1-O-β-d -(6′-O-galloyl)-glucopyranosyl-3-methoxy-5-hydroxybenzene, epigallocatechin-(4β→8)-epigallocatechin-3-O-gallate, 1-O-β-d- glucopyranosyl-3-methoxy-5-hydroxybenzene and rhododendrin (betuloside). It also contains ellagitannins of the punicalagin type.

References

External links

 
 
 
 Jepson Manual Treatment - Cistus salviifolius

Flora of France
salviifolius
Drought-tolerant plants
Flora of Italy
Flora of Lebanon
Flora of Morocco
Flora of North Africa
Flora of Portugal
Flora of Spain
Flora of Western Asia
Garden plants of Africa
Garden plants of Europe
Taxa named by Carl Linnaeus
Flora of Bulgaria
Flora of the Mediterranean Basin